The Peacock class is a class of patrol corvette built for the Royal Navy. Five were constructed, and by 1997 all had been sold to the Irish Naval Service or the Philippine Navy.

Original use
The five ships of this class were originally part of the Hong Kong Squadron of the Royal Navy. The ships were built by Hall, Russell & Company of Aberdeen in the United Kingdom and were commissioned into Royal Navy service between 1983 and 1985. They were specifically built for service in Hong Kong with the 6th Patrol Craft Squadron; for work in tropical climates they were fully air conditioned and were capable of remaining at sea during typhoons. As well as ‘flying the flag’ and providing a constant naval presence in region, they could undertake a number of different roles including Seamanship, Navigation and Gunnery training and Search-and-Rescue duties for which they had facilities to carry divers (including a decompression chamber) and equipment to recover vessels and aircraft. They also worked with the Marine Department of the Royal Hong Kong Police Force and with Customs & Excise to decrease the constant flow of illegal immigrants, narcotics and electronic equipment into the colony. For these roles each vessel could carry two Avon Searider SR5M rigid-hulled inflatable boats and a small detachment of Royal Marines.

Philippine Navy
HMS Peacock (P239), HMS Plover (P240), and HMS Starling (P241) were sold to the Philippines and were officially turned over to the Philippine Navy on 1 August 1997 after Hong Kong was returned to China. In Philippine service they are designated s, and have been considerably 'up-gunned' with a 25 mm M242 Bushmaster and two 20 mm Oerlikon guns.

The Philippine Navy undertook several phases of upgrades on the three corvettes, with the first one completed in 2005 replacing the old radar and navigation systems. The second upgrade involved the improvements on its marine engineering systems, and a third upgrade included the improvement of combat systems.

Irish Naval Service

HMS Swallow (P242) and HMS Swift (P243) were both sold to the Irish Naval Service in 1988.

The two ships take their names from traditional Irish mythology: Órla, a grand niece (great niece) of Brian Boru, the 11th-century High King of Ireland.; and Ciara, a saint born in Tipperary around the year 611 AD. They replaced the three s, the last of which the Irish Navy had recently retired before the delivery of the Peacock class. 

The two ships were decommissioned on 8 July 2022  and are due to be replaced by ex-HMNZS Lake-class inshore patrol vessels, ex Rotoiti and Pukaki IPV in 2023.

Operators
 Irish Navy (ex-RN 1988–2022)
 Philippine Navy (ex-RN 1997–)
 Royal Navy (former 1982–1997)

See also 
 Emilio Jacinto-class corvette
 Osprey 55-class gunboat

References

External links
 List of patrol vessels in service
Irish Naval Service LÉ Orla webpage

Corvette classes
Patrol vessels of the Royal Navy
 
Ship classes of the Royal Navy